David Eugene Barrett is a professor of mathematics at the University of Michigan.

Barrett received his Ph.D. from the University of Chicago in 1982 under the supervision of Raghavan Narasimhan.

In 2012, Barrett became a fellow of the American Mathematical Society.

References

Year of birth missing (living people)
Living people
Fellows of the American Mathematical Society
20th-century American mathematicians
21st-century American mathematicians
University of Chicago alumni
University of Michigan faculty